Wągrowiec  is a town in west-central Poland,  from both Poznań and Bydgoszcz. Since the 18th century it has been the a seat of a powiat. Administratively it is attached to the Greater Poland Voivodeship. The town is situated in the middle of the ethnographic and historical region of Pałuki within Greater Poland and the Chodzież lake area, on the river Wełna and its tributaries Nielba and Struga, as well as on the shores of Durów Lake.

Geography
The region around the town is rich in lakes. The town itself sits in the middle of Lake Durowskie. The Wągrowiec municipal area boasts a rare attraction: two rivers, the Nielba and Wełna cross there, without commingling.

Administration
Wągrowiec is constituted as a gmina miejska, or municipal commune. The city is also the seat of the rural commune of Wągrowiec, as well as of powiat of Wągrowiec.

Situated in the Greater Poland Voivodeship since 1999, Wągrowiec was previously  a part of the Pila Voivodeship (1975–1998).

Economy
Wągrowiec is an important rail and road junction. There are several notable industries in the town, including the machinery factories (a branch of the Hipolit Cegielski factory in Poznań and a branch of the Zremb machinery factory), major food processing plants (a mill, meat canning factory and a milk yard) and a furniture factory. The town is also a centre of tourism, with several hotels along the shores of the lake.

History

The town was founded as a small village called Prostynie by the Cistercian monks from the monastery in Łekno in 1319. In 1381 the name of Wągrowiec is mentioned for the first time in connection with the place. By that time the town received city rights, most likely modelled after the Magdeburg Law. It was a private church town, administratively located in the Kcynia County in the Kalisz Voivodeship in the Greater Poland Province of the Polish Crown. At the end of the 14th century, King Władysław II Jagiello gave the city the privileges of market and fair, and in 1396 the Cistercian monastery was moved in.

The town soon started to prosper. In the 15th and 16th centuries it was an important centre of trade, commerce, and manufacture (mostly textiles). In the 16th century, the Cistercians founded a school in Wągrowiec. This prosperity came to a halt during the Deluge, when in 1656 the town was captured, pillaged and burnt by the forces of Charles X of Sweden.

After the Second Partition of Poland, Wągrowiec in 1793 was annexed by the Kingdom of Prussia and was confiscated from the Cistercians in 1797. Initially a part of the newly created province of South Prussia, it was in 1807 transferred to the Duchy of Warsaw, a state allied to the Napoleonic France. After Napoleon's defeat and the Congress of Vienna in 1815, Wągrowiec was again annexed by Prussia; this time it was made a part of the autonomous Grand Duchy of Poznań.

The populace was subjected to anti-Polish policies, including Germanisation. In 1835 the Cistercian monastic order was dissolved, and its property was confiscated by the Prussian authorities. In the 1830s, the Marianie secret resistance organization of Polish gymnasium students was formed in the town. On February 9, 1849, the autonomy of the Duchy was cancelled, and Wągrowiec — under the Germanized name of Wongrowitz—became part of the Province of Posen. In 1888 a railroad line linking Wągrowiec with Poznań was opened. In 1906–1907, local Polish school children protested against Germanisation, and the protests spread to nearby villages. German teachers used corporal punishment for the protests, especially flogging, and older students were expelled from the gymnasium.

After World War I, in 1918, Poland regained independence and Wągrowiec became the first town of northern Greater Poland to be liberated by the Poles during the Greater Poland Uprising. Polish inhabitants of Wągrowiec formed an insurgent unit, led by Włodzimierz Kowalski, a teacher from the nearby village of Czerlin, which fought in various battles in northern Greater Poland in 1919. The town was reintegrated with the Republic of Poland, and the local populace had to acquire Polish citizenship or leave the country. This led to a significant decline of ethnic Germans, whose number within the district decreased from 16,309 in 1910 to 8,401 in 1926 and further to 7,143 in 1934.

Following the Molotov–Ribbentrop Pact and the end of the invasion of Poland, which started World War II in 1939, the town was annexed by Nazi Germany. Already on September 7, 1939, German troops carried out a massacre of eight Poles in Wągrowiec. During the German occupation, Wągrowiec was part of the German Reichsgau Wartheland and its name was changed by the Nazis to Eichenbrück. Germany operated a Nazi prison in the town. Poles from various settlements of the region were imprisoned in the town, and afterwards, on December 8, 1939, the Germans carried out a massacre of 107 Poles, including activists, participants of the uprising of 1918-1919, teachers, students, farmers, merchants, in the forest near Bukowiec, north of Wągrowiec. Many Polish inhabitants were expelled to the more easterly areas of German-occupied Poland (General Government) as part of the implementation of Lebensraum policies. In August 1944, the Germans carried out mass arrests of local members of the Home Army, the leading Polish underground resistance organization. Wągrowiec was liberated in January 1945 and the expelled Polish inhabitants returned. Polish schooling resumed in February 1945.

Notable architecture and other attractions

 The Gothic parish church with a belfry containing Renaissance polychromies dating to (1587)
 A Baroque Cistercian monastery (late 18th century)
 Late Baroque Cistercian church (late 18th century, burnt in 1945, rebuilt in 1946-1962)
 Opatówka abbey – the former seat of the Cistercian abbots, now a regional museum
 Pyramid of Lakiński – the pyramid-shaped tomb of a Polish captain who served in Napoleon's army
 The Dębina oak tree reserve with trees more than 200 years old and up to 40 metres tall, just outside the city limits
 A 5 floor residential high-rise with a large red-white painted mast on top

Cuisine
Wągrowiec is one of the production sites of the Greater Poland liliput cheese (ser liliput wielkopolski), a traditional regional Polish cheese, protected as a traditional food by the Ministry of Agriculture and Rural Development of Poland.

Sport
Nielba Wągrowiec is the town's professional sports club consisting of a football section and a handball section. The men's handball team plays in the second tier, but it also played in the top division, most recently in 2015. The men's football team competes in the lower professional and semi-professional leagues.

Education 
In Wągrowiec, there are five primary schools and four secondary schools, including two vocational schools. Two private colleges opened branches in Wągrowiec, Gnieźnieńska Szkoła Wyższa Milenium and the Akademia Nauk Stosowanych im. Księcia Mieszka I w Poznaniu.

International relations

Twin towns – Sister cities
Wągrowiec is twinned with:
  Schönwalde-Glien, Brandenburg, Germany
  Adendorf, Lower Saxony, Germany
  Gyula, Hungary
  Krasnogorsk, Moscow Oblast, Russia
  Le Plessis-Trévise, Val-de-Marne, Île-de-France, France
  Burladingen, Baden-Württemberg, Germany
  Muggensturm, Baden-Württemberg, Germany

Notable people

 Jakub Wujek (1541–1597), author of one of the oldest translations of the Bible into the Polish language
 Adam of Wągrowiec, organist and composer was a Cistercian monk in town, died (1629)
 Karl Eduard Arnd (1802–1874), German historian and author 
 Max Gerson, (1881–1959), German physician
 Stephan Rittau (1891–1942), Wehrmacht general
 Fritz Steuben (1898–1981), German author

See also
 Kreis Wongrowitz – "county" during the Prussian administration
 Standesamt Wongrowitz

References

External links
  Municipal site
 Postcard of Eichenbrück during the Nazi era

Cities and towns in Greater Poland Voivodeship
Wągrowiec County
Poznań Voivodeship (1921–1939)
1319 establishments in Europe
Populated places established in the 1310s
14th-century establishments in Poland
Nazi war crimes in Poland